The list of women artists in the Armory Show attempts to include women artists from the United States and Europe who were exhibited in the Armory Show of 1913. The show contained approximately 1300 works by 300 artists. A high proportion of the artists were women, many of whom have since been neglected. The list is largely drawn from the catalog of the 1963 exhibition, 1913 Armory Show 50th Anniversary Exhibition organized by the Munson-Williams-Proctor Arts Institute.

The Armory Show refers to the International Exhibition of Modern Art that was organized by the Association of American Painters and Sculptors and opened in New York City's 69th Regiment Armory, on Lexington Avenue between 25th and 26th Streets, on February 17, 1913, and ran to March 15. It became a legendary watershed date in the history of American art, introducing astonished New Yorkers, accustomed to realistic art, to modern art. The show served as a catalyst for American artists, who became more independent and created their own artistic language.

The artists

The following artists are all listed in the 50th anniversary catalog as having exhibited in the 1913 Armory show. Artists are also listed in The Story of the Armory Show. Of the fifty women listed, thirty were initially invited to participate. Twenty more women, who submitted works to a review committee, were also included. Many are discussed in detail in Women of the 1913 Armory Show: Their Contributions to the Development of American Modern Art (2014).

 Florence Howell Barkley
 Marion H. Beckett
 Bessie Marsh Brewer
 Fannie Miller Brown
 Edith Woodman Burroughs
 Mary Cassatt
 Émilie Charmy
 Nessa Cohen
 Kate Cory
 Edith Dimock (Mrs. William Glackens)
 Katherine S. Dreier
 Aileen King Dresser
 Florence Dreyfous
 Abastenia St. Leger Eberle
 Florence Esté
 Lily Everett
 Mary Foote
 Anne Goldthwaite
 Edith Haworth
 Margaret Hoard
 Margaret Wendell Huntington
 Gwen John
 Grace Mott Johnson
 Edith L. King
 Hermine E. Kleinert
 Marie Laurencin
 Amy Londoner
 Jacqueline Marval
 Carolyn Mase
 Kathleen McEnery
 Charlotte Meltzer
 Myra Musselmann-Carr
 Ethel Myers
 Helen J. Niles
 Olga Oppenheimer
 Marjorie Organ (Mrs. Robert Henri)
 Josephine Paddock
 Agnes Lawrence Pelton
 Harriet Sophia Phillips
 Louise Pope
 May Wilson Preston
 Katharine Rhoades
 Mary Rogers
 Frances Simpson Stevens
 Bessie Potter Vonnoh
 Hilda Ward
 Enid Yandell
 Marguerite Zorach

The artworks

The following list of artworks in the Armory Show is compiled from "The Armory Show at 100" from the New York Historical Society and from various catalogs describing the show.

 Florence Howell Barkley (1880/81–1954)
 Landscape over the City, now titled Jerome Avenue Bridge, 1910–11, oil, Museum of the City of New York
 Marion H. Beckett (1886–1949)
 Portrait of Mrs. Charles H. Beckett, oil 
 Portrait of Mrs. Eduard J. Steichen, oil
 Bessie Marsh Brewer (1884–1952)
  The Furnished Room
  Curiosity 
  Putting Her Monday Name on Her Letterbox
 Fannie Miller Brown (Fannie Wilcox Brown?, b. 1882)
 Embroidery
 Edith Woodman Burroughs (Edith Woodman; Mrs. Bryson Burroughs) (1871–1916)
 Bust, now titled Portrait of John Bigelow, ca. 1910, bronze, Museum of Art, Rhode Island School of Design, Providence
 Mary Cassatt (1844-1926)
 Mère et enfant, 1903, oil
 Mère et enfant, watercolor, John Quinn
 Émilie Charmy (1878–1974)
 Roses, oil
 Paysage, now titled L’Estaque, ca. 1910, oil, Art Institute of Chicago
 Soir, oil
 Ajaccio, oil
 Nessa Cohen (1885–1976)
 Age, plaster
 Portrait, plaster, Kuhn catalogue: $200; MacRae catalogue: $300; possibly destroyed
Sunrise, bronze
 Kate Cory  (1861–1968)
 Arizona Desert, oil
 Edith Dimock (Mrs. William Glackens) (1876–1955)
 Sweat Shop Girls in the Country, ca. 1913, watercolor, Bernard Goldberg Fine Arts, LLC
 Mother and Daughter, ca. 1913, watercolor, Bernard Goldberg Fine Arts, LLC
 Group, now titled Fine Fruits, watercolor, Bernard Goldberg Fine Arts, LLC
 Group, now titled Three Women, watercolor, Bernard Goldberg Fine Arts, LLC
 Group, now titled Florist, watercolor, Bernard Goldberg Fine Arts, LLC
 Group, now titled Bridal Shop, watercolor, Bernard Goldberg Fine Arts, LLC
 Group, watercolor
 Group, watercolor
 Drawings 
 Katherine Sophie Dreier (1877–1952)
 Blue Bowl, oil, Yale University Art Gallery, New Haven, Connecticut
 The Avenue, Holland, oil, George Walter Vincent Smith Art Museum, Springfield, Massachusetts
 Aileen King Dresser (1889–1955)
 Quai de la Tournelle, Paris, oil
 Madame DuBois, oil
 Notre Dame, Spring, oil
 Florence Dreyfous (1868–1950)
 A Boy, watercolor
 Mildred, watercolor
 Abastenia St. Leger Eberle(1878–1942)
 Group, Coney Island, sculpture, Corcoran Gallery of Art, Washington, D.C.
White Slave, 1913, bronze, Gloria and Larry Silver, Connecticut
 Florence Esté (1860–1926)
 The Village, watercolor, Kuhn catalogue, MacRae catalogue
 The First Snow, watercolor, Kuhn catalogue, MacRae catalogue
 Lily Abbott Everett (b. 1889)
 Sunset on the Cottonfields, oil
 Mary Foote (1872–1968)
 Portrait, now titled Old Lady, oil, sold to the Friends of American Art in Chicago
 Anne Goldthwaite (1875–1944)
 The Church on the Hill, now titled The House on the Hill, ca. 1911, oil, Blount Corporate Art Collection, Blount International
 Prince’s Feathers, oil
 Edith Haworth (1878–1953)
 The Birthday Party, oil
 The Village Band, oil
 Margaret Hoard (1879–1944)
 Study of an Old Lady, plaster
 Margaret Wendell Huntington (1867–1958)
 Cliffs Newquay, oil
 Gwen John (1876–1939)
 Girl Reading at the Window, 1911, oil, The Museum of Modern Art, New York
 A Woman in a Red Shawl, 1912, oil
 Grace Mott Johnson (1882–1967)
Chimpanzee, bronze, private collection, New York
Chimpanzees, bronze, Woodstock Art Association Museum, New York
 Greyhound Pup, No. 2, bronze
 Relief (goat), plaster
 Edith L. King (1884–1975)
 Statue at Ravello, watercolor
 Bathing Hours, Capri, watercolor
 The Bathers, Capri, watercolor
 The Piccola Marina, Capri, watercolor
 The Marina Grande, watercolor
 Hermine E. Kleinert (1880–1943)
 Portrait Study, oil
 Marie Laurencin (1885–1956)
 Portrait, watercolor
 Desdemona, watercolor
 Jeune Fille avec éventail, drawing
 Jeune Fille, drawing
 La Toilette des jeunes filles, oil
 La Poétesse, oil
 Nature morte, oil
 Amy Londoner (1878–1953)
 The Beach Crowd, pastel
 Playing Ball on the Beach, pastel
 The Beach Umbrellas, pastel
 The Life Guards, pastel
 Jacqueline Marval (1866–1932)
 Odalisques au miroir, oil, private collection, France
 Carolyn Mase (1880–1949)
 September Haze, pastel
 Kathleen McEnery (1885–1971)
 Going to the Bath, 1912, oil, Smithsonian American Art Museum, Washington, D.C.
 Dream, 1912, oil
 Charlotte Meltzer
 Hunters, oil
 Loverene', oil
 Myra Musselmann-Carr (b. 1871)
 Electra, statuette, bronze
 Indian Grinding Corn, statuette, bronze
 Old Woman, substituted in the Kuhn catalogue
 Ethel Myers (1881–1960)
 The Matron, elsewhere called The Fat Woman, 1912, plaster
 Fifth Avenue Gossips, plaster
 Fifth Avenue Girl, 1912, sculpture,  Mrs. Albert Lewisohn, private collection
 Girl from Madison Avenue, 1912, plaster
 Portrait Impression of Mrs. D. M., 1913, bronze, Nan and David Skier
 The Window, plaster
 The Gambler, 1912, plaster, Barry Edward Downes, New York
 Upper Corridor, plaster
 The Duchess, plaster
 Helen J. Niles
 Phyllis, oil
 Olga Oppenheimer (1886–1941)
 Woodcuts, Nos. 1–6, 1911 (illustrations for Van Zantens glückliche Zeit by Laurids Bruun)
 Marjorie Organ (Mrs. Robert Henri) (1886–1931)
 Drawings, Nos. 1–6
 Josephine Paddock (1885–1964)
 Swan on the Grass, 1910, watercolor
 Swan Study - Peace, 1910, watercolor
 Swan Study - Aspiration, 1910, watercolor
 Agnes Lawrence Pelton (1881–1961)
 Vine Wood, ca. 1910, oil, Alec Esker, Yuma, Arizona
 Stone Age, oil
 Harriet Sophia Phillips (1849–1928)
 Head, oil
 Louise Pope, Mrs. Henri Hourtal
 Portrait of Mrs. P., oil
 May Wilson Preston  (1873–1949)
 Girl with Print, oil
 Katharine Rhoades Catherine N. Rhoades (1895–ca. 1938)
 Talloires, oil
 Mary Rogers Mary C. Rogers (1881–1920)
 Portrait, 1911, oil
 Frances Simpson Stevens (1894–1976)
 Roof Tops of Madrid, oil
 Bessie Potter Vonnoh (1872–1955)
 Dancing Figure, bronze
 Nude, terracotta
 Study, terracotta
 Hilda Ward  (1878–1950)
 The Hound, 1910, pastel
 The Kennels, 1910, drawing, Francis M. Naumann and Marie T. Keller, Yorktown Heights, New York
 Enid Yandell (1870–1934)
 The Five Senses, bronze
 Indian and Fisher Marguerite Zorach  (1888–1968)
 Study'', oil

Black and white reproductions
The following are works which appeared in the Armory Show, for which color images are not available. They can be useful in identifying the works that were shown.

Sculpture

References

Armory Show
Armory Show, Women
.Armory Show, Women
Armory Show, Women
Armory Show, Women
Armory Show, Women
Armory Show, Women
Armory Show, Women
Armory Show, Women
Armory Show, Women
Armory Show, Women
1913 in art
History of women in New York City